Monocerotesa proximesta is a moth of the family Geometridae first described by Jeremy Daniel Holloway in 1993. It is found in Borneo.

The wingspan is 9–10 mm.

External links

Boarmiini